Chemistry is the second studio album by Australian rock band Mondo Rock, produced by Mark Moffat, and released in July 1981.  It was released in the US in January 1982 on Atlantic Records. The album was certified 2× Platinum in Australia.

At the 1981 Countdown Australian Music Awards the album won Best Australian Album.

In 2014, the album was remastered and reissued with two bonus tracks, previously unreleased demos and came with a second disc of live tracks.

Reception
On its US release, Billboard described it as "state of the art rock that can be played on a variety of formats". In 2014, Cream Magazine described it as "one of the better albums of its year of release".

Chart performance and singles
Chemistry peaked at number 3 in Australia during a 33-week run beginning in July 1981. It was released through the Avenue Records label. State Of The Heart first charted on November 17, 1980, peaked at 6th position and stayed in the charts for 26 weeks. Mondo Rock released the single "Cool World" in 1981. It was released through the Avenue Records label. Cool World first charted on April 13, 1981, peaked at 8th position and stayed in the charts for 20 weeks. Mondo Rock released the single "Summer Of '81" in 1981. "Summer Of '81" first charted on November 16, 1981, peaked at 31st position and stayed in the charts for 17 weeks. Their second album, Chemistry was issued in July 1981, which peaked at No. 2 on the Australian Kent Music Report Albums Chart. Mondo Rock reached the top 10 on the related Kent Music Report Singles Chart with "State of the Heart" (October 1980) and "Cool World" (April 1981).

2014 live shows
In 2014 the band reformed to play the album live on its 33 anniversary.

Track listing

Bonus tracks (Single B-sides)

Previously unreleased demos

Disc 2 (Live)

Note
Compared to the LP version, the CD has switched "side A" and "side B" in its track order.

Personnel
Mondo Rock:
Ross Wilson – vocals
Eric McCusker – guitar, backing vocals
James Black – keyboards, backing vocals
Paul Christie – bass, backing vocals
John James Hackett – drums (on "We're No Angels" only)

According to the original liner notes, "these quasi-members also played drums"
Andrew Buchanan (tracks 3, 8, 12)
Gil Matthews (tracks 4, 9, 11, 13, 14, 15, 16)
Graham "Buzz" Bidstrup (1, 2, 5, 6, 7)

On the live tracks on CD 2, the drummers are:
John James Hackett (1, 2, 3, 4, 12, 13)
Gil Matthews (tracks  5–11)

Production team:
Original album (except "State Of The Heart") + "Back On The Outside"
Producer, Engineer – Mark Moffatt 
Engineers – Jim Barton, Ross Cockle, Scott Hemming

"State Of The Heart" + "Mona Lisa"
Producer, Engineer – Ern Rose
Re-mix Engineer ("State Of The Heart") – Gil Matthews

Previously Unreleased Demos 
Engineer, Mixed by – Gil Matthews

Live tracks
Producer – Jim Barton and Mondo Rock
Engineers – Jim Barton, Keith Walker

Charts

Weekly charts

Year-end charts

References

1981 albums
Mondo Rock albums
Atlantic Records albums